The Men's javelin throw event took place on July 10, 2011 at the Kobe Universiade Memorial Stadium.

Medalists

Records

Results

Final

References

2011 Asian Athletics Championships
Javelin throw at the Asian Athletics Championships